Michael Ludwig (born 19 December 1972) is an Austrian fencer. He competed in the foil events at the 1992, 1996 and 2000 Summer Olympics. Ludwig was awarded the Silver Decoration of Honour for Services to the Republic of Austria in 1997.

References

External links
 

1972 births
Living people
Austrian male fencers
Austrian foil fencers
Olympic fencers of Austria
Fencers at the 1992 Summer Olympics
Fencers at the 1996 Summer Olympics
Fencers at the 2000 Summer Olympics
Universiade medalists in fencing
Recipients of the Decoration of Honour for Services to the Republic of Austria
Fencers from Vienna
Universiade silver medalists for Austria
Medalists at the 1999 Summer Universiade